USS Fulton (AS-11) was the leader of her class of seven submarine tenders, launched on 27 December 1940 by Mare Island Navy Yard and sponsored by Mrs. A. T. Sutcliffe, great-granddaughter of Robert Fulton. Fulton was commissioned on 12 September 1941.

Service history

World War II
Fulton was underway on her shakedown cruise out of San Diego when the Japanese attacked Pearl Harbor on 7 December 1941. She was ordered at once to Panama, arriving on 9 December. During the next month, she established advanced seaplane bases in the Gulf of Fonseca, Nicaragua, and in the Galapagos Islands, then returned to San Diego to prepare for Pacific duty. She tended Pacific Fleet submarines at Pearl Harbor from 15 March-8 July 1942, putting to sea during the Battle of Midway. She transported many of the survivors of the sunken aircraft carrier  back to Pearl Harbor, arriving on 8 June. She was at Midway until 17 October; and at Brisbane from 9 November. There she established a submarine base and rest camp, and in addition to refitting submarines between their war patrols, acted as tender to other types of ships. Milne Bay, New Guinea was her station from 29 October 1943 – 17 March 1944, when she sailed for a west coast overhaul.

Returning to Pearl Harbor on 13 June 1944, Fulton gave her services to submarines there for a month, then at Midway from 18 July-8 September, and then at Saipan until 25 April 1945. She returned to duty at Pearl Harbor from 7 May-9 June, and then sailed for Guam, where she refitted submarines for the last patrols of the war.

Post-war service

1946-1947
After a west coast overhaul, Fulton served as tender at Pearl Harbor from February–May 1946, then sailed for Bikini Atoll to participate in Operation Crossroads—atomic weapons tests in the Marshalls—that summer. In addition to caring for the six submarines assigned to the project, she acted as repair ship for other vessels in the task force. On 18 September 1946, she arrived at Mare Island Navy Yard, where she was decommissioned and placed in reserve on 3 April 1947.

1951-1960

Recommissioned on 10 April 1951, Fulton sailed three weeks later for New London, her home port for the next forty years until she was decommissioned in 1991. Her primary assignment was as tender for Submarine Squadron 10 (SubRon 10) at New London, but she occasionally relieved fellow tender  at Norfolk, Virginia, and also left New London for exercises from Newfoundland and Iceland to the Caribbean. She first crossed the Atlantic in the fall of 1957 for Operation Natoflex, visiting Rothesay, Scotland, and Portland, England, before returning to New London. A heightening of her responsibility came on 1 April 1958, when three nuclear submarines were assigned to her squadron. From August 1959-January 1960, the tender underwent a modernization overhaul at the Philadelphia Naval Shipyard in order to be able to service both nuclear and conventional submarines, whether at home or overseas, making her the world's first nuclear support tender.

She continued to serve as flagship and tender to Submarine Squadron 10 when it became the first all nuclear submarine squadron.  Among the historic and innovative submarines assigned to Submarine Squadron 10 during Fulton'''s service were the Nautilus, Seawolf, Skate, Triton and Skipjack.

1972-1991
From July to December 1972, Fulton made a five-month deployment to the Mediterranean. Her mission was to prepare for full-time use as an advance refit site for nuclear-powered fast attack submarines. This was the first deployment of a World War II-vintage submarine tender to the Mediterranean since World War II.

After a shipyard overhaul in 1976, Fulton returned to New London to continue to support Atlantic Fleet Submarines. She was modernized in 1983-1984 during an extensive overhaul conducted at Electric Boat in Groton, Connecticut and General Dynamics, Quincy, Massachusetts. In January 1985, she made a four-month deployment to the Mediterranean where she provided maintenance for the 6th Fleet submarines in La Maddalena, Italy.

The tender made cruises to Puerto Rico in January 1986 and Bermuda in March 1987. From 13 January-12 March 1988, she completed a Drydocking Selected Restricted Availability at Norfolk Shipbuilding Company, Norfolk, Virginia. She returned to State Pier and continued to support SubRon 10 submarines until her decommissioning in 1991.

On 30 September 1991, SubRon 10 was disbanded and Fulton was decommissioned at her berth in New London, Connecticut. Vulcan was decommissioned on the same day as Fulton.

Awards
During her career the USS Fulton'' earned the following awards -

References

External links
USS Fulton.org

 

Fulton-class submarine tenders
Submarine tenders of the United States Navy
Submarine tenders
United States Navy
Ships built in Vallejo, California
1940 ships